Emidio Morganti (born 23 July 1966, in Ascoli Piceno) is an Italian football referee. He won the Serie A Referee of the Year award in 2010.

References 

1966 births
Living people
People from Ascoli Piceno
Italian football referees
Sportspeople from the Province of Ascoli Piceno